The Russian Empire gradually entered World War I during the three days prior to 28th July 1914. This began with Austria-Hungary's declaration of war against Serbia, which was a Russian ally. The Russian Empire sent an ultimatum, via Saint Petersburg, to Vienna, warning Austria-Hungary not to attack Serbia. Following the invasion of Serbia, Russia began to mobilize its reserve army near its border with Austria-Hungary. Consequently, on 31st July, German leadership in Berlin demanded Russian demobilization. There was no response, which resulted in the German declaration of war on Russia on the same day (1st August 1914). In accordance with its war plan, Germany disregarded Russia and moved first against France, declaring war on 3rd August. Germany sent its main armies through Belgium to surround Paris. The threat to Belgium caused Britain to declare war on Germany on 4th August. The Ottoman Empire soon joined the Central Powers and fought Russia along their border.

Historians researching the causes of World War I have emphasized the role of Germany and Austria-Hungary. Scholarly consensus has typically minimized Russian involvement in the outbreak of this mass conflict. Key elements were Russia's defense of Orthodox Serbia, its pan-Slavic roles, its treaty obligations with France, and its concern with protecting its status as a world power. However, historian Sean McMeekin emphasizes Russian plans to expand its empire southward and to seize Constantinople (modern-day Istanbul) as an outlet to the Mediterranean Sea.

Archduke Franz Ferdinand, the heir to the Austro-Hungarian throne, was assassinated by Bosnian Serbs on 28th June 1914, due to Austria-Hungary's annexation of the largely Slavic province. Vienna was unable to find evidence that the Serbian state had sponsored this assassination, but one month later, it issued an ultimatum to Serbia, which it assumed would be rejected and thus lead to war. Austria-Hungary deemed Serbia to be deserving of punishment for the assassination of Archduke Franz Ferdinand. Although Russia had no formal treaty obligation to Serbia, it stressed its desire to control the Balkans and had a long-term perspective toward gaining a military advantage over Germany and Austria-Hungary in the region. Russia had the incentive to delay militarization and the majority of its leaders wanted to avoid war. However, Russia had yielded French support and feared that a failure to defend Serbia would lead to the loss of Russian credibility, constituting a major political defeat in its goal of controlling the Balkans. Tsar Nicholas II mobilized Russian forces on 30th July 1914 to threaten Austria-Hungary if it invaded Serbia. Historian Christopher Clark believes that the "Russian general mobilization [of 30th July] was one of the most momentous decisions of the August crisis". The first general mobilization occurred before the German government declared a state of impending war.

Russia's threatening of Germany resulted in military action by German forces, which followed through with its own mobilization and a declaration of war on 1st August 1914. At the outset of hostilities, Russian forces led offensives against both Germany and Austria-Hungary.

Background

Between 1873 and 1887, Russia was allied with Germany and Austria-Hungary in the League of the Three Emperors, and then with Germany in the 1887–1890 Reinsurance Treaty. Both collapsed because of the competing interests of Austria-Hungary and Russia in the Balkans. France took advantage of this, agreeing to the 1894 Franco-Russian Alliance, but Britain viewed Russia with deep suspicion because of the Great Game. The proximity threatened to bring the two powers into conflict along with the long-held Russian objective of gaining control of the Bosporus Straits, and with it access to the British-dominated Mediterranean Sea.       

Britain's isolation during the 1899–1902 Second Boer War and Russia's defeat in the 1905 Russo-Japanese War led both parties to seek allies. The Anglo-Russian Convention of 1907 settled disputes in Asia and allowed the establishment of the Triple Entente with France, which was largely informal. In 1908, Austria-Hungary annexed the former Ottoman province of Bosnia and Herzegovina, prompting the Russian response of the Balkan League to prevent further Austrian expansion.

In the 1912–1913 First Balkan War, Serbia, Bulgaria, and Greece captured most of the remaining Ottoman possessions in Europe. Disputes over their division resulted in the Second Balkan War, in which Bulgaria was comprehensively defeated by its former allies. This defeat turned Bulgaria into a revanchist local power, which fueled a second opportunity to fulfill its national aspirations. This left Serbia as the most important Russian ally in the region.

Russia's industrial base and railway network had significantly improved since 1905, although from a relatively low base. In 1913, Nicholas II approved an increase in the Russian Army of over 500,000 men. Although there was no formal alliance between Russia and Serbia, their close bilateral links provided Russia with a route into the crumbling Ottoman Empire, where Germany also had significant interests. Combined with the increase in Russian military strength, both Austria and Germany felt threatened by Serbia's expansion. When Austria invaded Serbia on July 28, 1914, Russian Foreign Minister Sergei Sazonov viewed it as an Austro-German conspiracy to end Russian influence in the Balkans.

On July 30, Russia declared a general mobilization in support of Serbia. The next day, on August 1, Germany declared war on Russia, followed by Austria-Hungary on August 6. Russia and the Entente declared war on the Ottoman Empire in November 1914, after Ottoman warships bombarded the Black Sea port of Odessa in late October.

Major players
Most historians agree that, generally, Russia's top military leadership was tremendously incompetent. Tsar Nicholas II made all final decisions but was repeatedly given conflicting advice by his peers, resulting in unsound decision-making throughout his time in power. He set up a deeply flawed organizational structure that proved inadequate for the high pressures and the instant demands of wartime. The British historian David Stevenson, for example, points to the "disastrous consequences of deficient civil-military liaison," in which civilians and generals were not in contact with each other. The government was entirely unaware of its fatal weaknesses and remained out of touch with public opinion. The Foreign Minister had to warn Nicholas that "unless he yielded to the popular demand and unsheathed the sword on Serbia's behalf, he would run the risk of revolution and the loss of his throne." Nicholas yielded, but nonetheless lost his throne. Stevenson concludes: 
Russian decision-making in July [1914] was more truly a tragedy of miscalculation... a policy of deterrence that failed to deter. Yet, [like Germany] it too rested on the assumption that war was possible without domestic breakdown, and that it could be waged with a reasonable prospect of success. Russia was more vulnerable to social upheaval than any other power. Its socialists were more estranged from the existing order than those elsewhere in Europe, and a strike wave among the industrial workforce reached a crescendo with the general stoppage in St. Petersburg in July 1914.

Foreign Minister Sergei Sazonov was not a powerful figure in the events leading up to Russia's entry into World War 1, nor did he play a consequential role in Russia's decisions following their entry. According to the historian Thomas Otte, "Sazonov felt too insecure to advance his positions against stronger men... Tsar Nicholas II tended to yield rather than to press home his own views... "At the critical stages of the July crisis, Sazonov was inconsistent and showed an uncertain grasp of international realities."

French Ambassador Maurice Paléologue quickly became influential by repeatedly promising France would go to war alongside Russia, which reflected the position of President Raymond Poincaré.

Serious planning for a future war was practically impossible because of the complex rivalries and priorities given to royalty. The main criteria for high command were linkage to the royalty, rather than expertise. The General Staff had expertise but was often outweighed by the elite Imperial Guards, a favorite bastion of the aristocracy that prized throwing parades over planning large-scale military maneuvers. This led to the grand dukes inevitably gaining high command.

French alliance
Russia depended heavily on the French alliance, since a two-front war against Germany was winnable, but not if Russia was alone. The French ambassador, Maurice Paléologue, hated Germany and saw that when war broke out, France and Russia had to be close allies against Germany. His approach agreed with French President Raymond Poincaré. Unconditional French support to Russia was promised in the unfolding crisis with Germany and Austria. Historians debate whether Paléologue exceeded his instructions, but agree that he failed to inform Paris of exactly what was happening, and he did not warn that Russian mobilization might launch a world war.

Beginning of war
On June 28, 1914, Archduke Franz Ferdinand of Austria was assassinated in Sarajevo, and Tsar Nicholas II vacillated as to Russia's course of action. A relatively-new factor influencing Russian policy was the growth of Pan-Slavism, which identified Russia's duty to all Slavs, especially those who practiced Eastern Orthodox Christianity. The growth of that impulse shifted attention away from the Ottoman Empire and toward the threat posed to the Slavic people by Austria-Hungary. Serbia identified itself as the champion of the Pan-Slavic ideal, and Austria-Hungary planned to destroy Serbia for that reason. Nicholas wanted to defend Serbia, but not to fight a war with Germany. In a series of letters exchanged with Kaiser Wilhelm of Germany (the so-called "Willy–Nicky correspondence"), both cousins proclaimed their desire for peace, and each attempted to get the other to back down. Nicholas desired Russia's mobilization to be only against Austria-Hungary in the hopes of avoiding war with Germany. The Kaiser, however, had pledged to support Austria-Hungary.

On July 25, 1914, Nicholas decided to intervene in the Austro-Serbian conflict, a step toward general war. He put the Russian army on "alert" on July 25. Although it was not general mobilization, the German and Austro-Hungarian borders were threatened and looked like military preparation for war. However, the Russian Army had few workable plans and no contingency plans for a partial mobilization. On July 30, 1914, Nicholas took the fateful step of confirming the order for general mobilization, despite being very reluctant.

On July 28, Austria-Hungary formally declared war against Serbia. Count Witte told the French Ambassador Maurice Palaeologus that the Russian point of view considered the war to be madness, Slavic solidarity to be simply nonsense and nothing could be hoped by war.

On July 30, Russia ordered general mobilization but still maintained that it would not attack if peace talks began. Germany, reacting to the discovery of Russian partial mobilization ordered on July 25, announced its own pre-mobilization posture, the imminent danger of war. Germany told Russia to demobilize within twelve hours. In St. Petersburg, at 7 p.m., the German ultimatum to Russia expired. The German ambassador to Russia met Russian Foreign Minister Sergei Sazonov; asked three times if Russia would reconsider; and delivered the note accepting Russia's war challenge and declaring war on August 1. On August 6, Franz Joseph I of Austria signed the Austro-Hungarian declaration of war against Russia.

At the outbreak of war, each of the European powers began to publish selected, and sometimes misleading, compendia of diplomatic correspondence, seeking to establish justification for their own entry into the war and to cast blame on other actors. The first of these color books to appear was the German White Book which appeared on August 4, 1914, the same day as Britain's war declaration. The British Blue Book came out two days later, followed by the Russian Orange Book in mid-August.

Military weakness
The outbreak of war on August 1, 1914, found Russia grossly unprepared. The Allies placed their faith in the Russian army. Its pre-war regular strength was 1,400,000, mobilization added 3,100,000 reserves. In every other aspect, however, Russia was unprepared for war. Russian heavy industry was not large enough to equip the massive armies that the Tsar could raise, and its reserves of munitions were small. While the German army in 1914 was better equipped than any other man for man, the Russian army was severely short on artillery pieces, shells, motorized transports, and boots.

Before the war, Russian planners had completely neglected the critical logistical issue of how the Allies could ship supplies and munitions to Russia. By 1915, a new rail line was begun which gave access to the ice-free port of Murmansk by 1917.

The Russian High Command was greatly weakened by the mutual contempt between War Minister Vladimir Sukhomlinov and Grand Duke Nicholas, who commanded the armies in the field. However, an immediate attack was ordered against the German province of East Prussia. The Germans mobilized there with great efficiency and completely defeated the two Russian armies that invaded. The Battle of Tannenberg, where the entire Russian Second Army was annihilated, cast an ominous shadow over the empire's future. The loyal officers lost were the very ones that were needed to protect the dynasty. The Russian armies had some success against both the Austro-Hungarian and the Ottoman Armies, but they were steadily pushed back by the German Army. In September 1914, to relieve pressure on France, the Russians were forced to halt a successful offensive against Austria-Hungary in Galicia to attack German-held Silesia.
The main Russian goal was focused on the Balkans and especially taking control of Constantinople (Istanbul). The Ottoman entry into the war opened up new opportunities, but Russia was much too hard-pressed to take advantage of them. Instead, the government incited Britain and France to the action at Gallipoli, which failed badly. Russia then incited a rebellion by the Armenians, who were massacred in one of the great atrocities of the war, the Armenian genocide. The combination of poor preparation and poor planning destroyed the morale of Russian troops and set the stage for the collapse of the entire regime in early 1917.

Gradually, a war of attrition set in on the vast Eastern Front; the Russians were facing the combined forces of Germany and Austria-Hungary and suffered staggering losses. General Anton Denikin, retreating from Galicia wrote:
The German heavy artillery swept away whole lines of trenches, and their defenders with them. We hardly replied. There was nothing with which we could reply. Our regiments, although completely exhausted, were beating off one attack after another by bayonet... Blood flowed unendingly, the ranks became thinner and thinner and thinner. The number of graves multiplied.

Legacy
Historians on the origin of the First World War have emphasized the role of Germany and Austria-Hungary. The consensus of scholars includes scant mention of Russia and only brief mentions of Russia's defense of Serbia, its pan-Slavic roles, its treaty obligations with France, and its concern for protecting its status as a great power.

However, the historian Sean McMeekin has emphasized Russia's aggressive expansionary goal to the south. He argues that for Russia the war was ultimately about the Ottoman Empire and that the Foreign Ministry and Army were planning a war of aggression from at least 1908 and perhaps even 1895. He emphasizes that the immediate goal was to seize Constantinople and an outlet to the Mediterranean by control of the Dardanelles and Bosporus straits.  Reviewers have generally been negative of McMeekin revisionist interpretation.

See also

 Foreign policy of the Russian Empire
 Allies of World War I
 Triple Entente
 Causes of World War I
 July Crisis
 Diplomatic history of World War I
 Austro-Hungarian entry into World War I
 British entry into World War I
 French entry into World War I
 German entry into World War I
 Ottoman entry into World War I
Historiography of the causes of World War I
 International relations of the Great Powers (1814–1919)

References

Further reading
 Albertini, Luigi. The Origins of the War of 1914 (3 vol 1952). vol 2 online covers July 1914
 Aleksinsky , Gregor. Russia and the great war (1915) pp 1–122. online free
 Bobroff, Ronald P. Roads to Glory: Late Imperial Russia and the Turkish Straits (I.B. Tauris 2006).
 Bobroff, Ronald P. "War Accepted but Unsought: Russia's Growing Militancy and the July Crisis, 1914", in Jack S. Levy and John A. Vasquez, eds., The Outbreak of the First World War (Cambridge UP 2014), 227–51. 
 Brandenburg, Erich. (1927) From Bismarck to the World War: A History of German Foreign Policy 1870–1914 (1927) online .
 Bury, J.P.T. "Diplomatic History 1900–1912, in C. L. Mowat, ed. The New Cambridge Modern History: Vol. XII: The Shifting Balance of World Forces 1898-1945 (2nd ed. 1968) online pp 112-139.
 Clark, Christopher. The Sleepwalkers: How Europe Went to War in 1914 (2013) excerpt
 Sleepwalkers lecture by Clark. online
 Engelstein, Laura. Russia in Flames: War, Revolution, Civil War, 1914-1921 (Oxford UP, 2018).
 Fay, Sidney B. The Origins of the World War (2 vols in one. 2nd ed. 1930). online, passim
 Fromkin, David. Europe's Last Summer: Who Started the Great War in 1914? (2004).
 Fuller, William C. Strategy and Power in Russia 1600–1914 (1998) excerpts; military strategy
 Gatrell, Peter. "Tsarist Russia at War: The View from Above, 1914–February 1917." Journal of Modern History 87.3 (2015): 668-700.  online
 Geyer, Dietrich. Russian Imperialism: The Interaction of Domestic and Foreign Policy, 1860-1914 (1987).
 Hewitson, Mark. Germany and the Causes of the First World War (2004) online
 Herweg, Holger H., and Neil Heyman. Biographical Dictionary of World War I (1982).
 Jelavich, Barbara. St. Petersburg and Moscow: tsarist and Soviet foreign policy, 1814-1974 (1974).
 Jelavich, Barbara. Russia's Balkan Entanglements, 1806-1914 (2004).
  online free to read
 Kennan, George Frost. The fateful Alliance: France, Russia, and the coming of the First World War (1984) online free to read; covers 1890 to 1894.
 
 Keithly, David M. "Did Russia Also Have War Aims in 1914?." East European Quarterly 21.2 (1987): 137+.
  Levy, Jack S., and William Mulligan. "Shifting power, preventive logic, and the response of the target: Germany, Russia, and the First World War." Journal of Strategic Studies 40.5 (2017): 731-769. online
 Lieven, Dominic. Empire: The Russian empire and its rivals (Yale UP, 2002), comparisons with British, Habsburg & Ottoman empires.excerpt
 Lieven, D.C.B. Russia and the Origins of the First World War (1983). online free to read
 Lincoln, W. Bruce. Passage Through Armageddon: The Russians in War and Revolution, 1914-1918 (1986) pp 23–59. 
 Lincoln, W. Bruce. In war's dark shadow : the Russians before the Great War (1983) online free to read pp 399–444.
 McMeekin, Sean. The Russian Origins of the First World War (2011).
 McMeekin, Sean. July 1914: Countdown to War (2014) scholarly account, day-by-day excerpt
 ; major scholarly overview
 Marshall, Alex. "Russian Military Intelligence, 1905–1917: The Untold Story behind Tsarist Russia in the First World War" War in History 11#4 (2004), pp. 393-423 online
 Menning, Bruce. "War planning and initial operations in the Russian context," in Richard F. Hamilton, Holger Herwig. eds., War Planning, 1914 (2010), 120–26.
 Menning, Bruce. "Russian Military Intelligence, July 1914: What St. Petersburg Perceived and Why it Mattered," Historian 77#2 (2015), 213–68. doi:10.1111/hisn.12065
 Neumann, Iver B. "Russia as a great power, 1815–2007." Journal of International Relations and Development 11#2 (2008): 128–151.
 Neilson, Keith. "Watching the ‘steamroller’: British observers and the Russian army before 1914." Journal of Strategic Studies 8.2 (1985): 199-217. 
 Olson, Gust, and Aleksei I. Miller. "Between Local and Inter-Imperial: Russian Imperial History in Search of Scope and Paradigm." Kritika: Explorations in Russian and Eurasian History (2004) 5#1 pp: 7–26.
 Otte, T. G. July Crisis: The World's Descent into War, Summer 1914 (Cambridge UP, 2014). online review
 Renzi, William A. "Who Composed" Sazonov Thirteen Points"? A Re-Examination of Russia's War Aims of 1914." American Historical Review 88.2 (1983): 347-357.  online; argues that French ambassador Maurice Paléologue was responsible
 Rich, Norman. Great Power Diplomacy: 1814-1914 (1991), a comprehensive survey 
 Rich, David Allen. "Russia," in Richard F. Hamilton and Holger H. Herwig, eds. Decisions for War, 1914-1917 (2004), pp  188–226.
 Ritter, Gerhard. The Sword and the Sceptre, Vol. 2-The European Powers and the  Wilhelminian Empire 1890-1914 (1970) Covers military policy in Germany and also France, Britain, Russia (pp 77–89) and Austria.
 Sanborn, Josh. "The mobilization of 1914 and the question of the Russian nation: A reexamination." Slavic Review 59.2 (2000): 267-289. online
 Schmitt, Bernadotte E. The coming of the war, 1914 (2 vol 1930) comprehensive history online vol 1; online vol 2, esp vol 2 ch 20 pp 334–382 
 Scott, Jonathan French. Five Weeks: The Surge of Public Opinion on the Eve of the Great War (1927)  online. especially ch 8: "The psychotic explosion in Russian" pp 154–79 
 Seton-Watson, Hugh. The Russian Empire 1801–1917 (1967) pp 677–697.
 Soroka, Marina. Britain, Russia and the Road to the First World War: The Fateful Embassy of Count Aleksandr Benckendorff (1903–16) (2016).
 Spring, D.W. "Russia and the Coming of War" in R. J. W. Evans ed., Coming of the First World War (2001) pp 57–86. online
 Stowell, Ellery Cory. The Diplomacy of the War of 1914 (1915)  728 pages online free
 
 Taylor, A.J.P. The Struggle for Mastery in Europe 1848–1918 (1954) online free
 Trachtenberg, Marc. "The Meaning of Mobilization in 1914" International Security 15#3 (1991) pp. 120–150 online
 Tucker, Spencer C., ed. The European Powers in the First World War: An Encyclopedia  (1996) 816pp
 Vovchenko, Denis. Containing Balkan Nationalism: Imperial Russia and Ottoman Christians, 1856-1914 (2016).
 Wildman, Allan K. The End of the Russian Imperial Army (Princeton UP, 1980).
 Williamson Jr., Samuel R. "German Perceptions of the Triple Entente after 1911: Their Mounting Apprehensions Reconsidered" Foreign Policy Analysis 7.2 (2011): 205-214.
 Wohlforth, William C. "The Perception of Power: Russia in the Pre-1914 Balance" World Politics 39#3 (April 1987), 353–81. doi:10.2307/2010224
 Zuber, Terence. Inventing the Schlieffen Plan: German War Planning, 1871-1914 (2002) online

Historiography
 Cornelissen, Christoph, and Arndt Weinrich, eds. Writing the Great War - The Historiography of World War I from 1918 to the Present (2020) free download; full coverage for major countries. 
 Gatrell, Peter. "Tsarist Russia at War: The View from Above, 1914 – February 1917." Journal of Modern History 87#3 (2015): 668–700. online
 Horne, John, ed. A Companion to World War I (2012) 38 topics essays by scholars
 Kramer, Alan. "Recent Historiography of the First World War – Part I", Journal of Modern European History (Feb. 2014) 12#1 pp 5–27; "Recent Historiography of the First World War (Part II)", (May 2014) 12#2 pp 155–174.
 Mombauer, Annika. "Guilt or Responsibility? The Hundred-Year Debate on the Origins of World War I." Central European History 48.4 (2015): 541-564.
 Mulligan, William. "The Trial Continues: New Directions in the Study of the Origins of the First World War." English Historical Review (2014) 129#538 pp: 639–666.
 Winter, Jay. and Antoine Prost eds.  The Great War in History: Debates and Controversies, 1914 to the Present (2005)

Primary sources
 Gooch, G.P. Recent revelations of European diplomacy (1928) pp 269–330. online
 Major 1914 documents from BYU online
  United States. War Dept. General Staff. Strength and organization of the armies of France, Germany, Austria, Russia, England, Italy, Mexico and Japan (showing conditions in July, 1914) (1916) online

External links

Entry into World War I
 
Entry into World War I
Russian Empire
Entry into World War I by country
1914 in Europe
1914 in international relations
Crisis